Peter Behl (born 12 February 1966) is a German former wrestler. He competed in the men's Greco-Roman 62 kg at the 1988 Summer Olympics.

References

External links
 

1966 births
Living people
German male sport wrestlers
Olympic wrestlers of West Germany
Wrestlers at the 1988 Summer Olympics
People from Aschaffenburg (district)
Sportspeople from Lower Franconia